Strange Nathanial Cragun House is a historic home located at Lebanon, Boone County, Indiana.  It was built in 1893, and is a -story, Queen Anne style, "T"-gabled frame dwelling.  It features a round corner tower and wraparound porch. It has housed the Boone County Historical Society since 1988.

It was listed on the National Register of Historic Places in 2011.

References

External links
Boone County Historical Society website

History museums in Indiana
Houses on the National Register of Historic Places in Indiana
Queen Anne architecture in Indiana
Houses completed in 1893
Houses in Boone County, Indiana
National Register of Historic Places in Boone County, Indiana
Museums in Boone County, Indiana